Inside Business is a weekly newspaper serving Norfolk, Virginia and the Hampton Roads area. Its articles focus on the regional business community. Inside Business was formerly known as The Hampton Roads Business Journal, and is published by Pilot Targeted Media, a division of The Virginian-Pilot.

External links
 

1995 establishments in Virginia
I
Mass media in Norfolk, Virginia
Newspapers established in 1995
Newspapers published in Virginia
Weekly newspapers published in the United States